Archbishop Miron (21 October 1957 – 10 April 2010), born Mirosław Chodakowski, was a Polish religious figure.

Chodakowski was born in Białystok.  He served as Orthodox Ordinary of the Polish Army until being killed in the 2010 Polish Air Force Tu-154 crash near Smolensk.

He entered the Orthodox Seminary of the Holy Spirit in Warsaw in 1972.  He gained holy orders on 17 December 1978.  Later, he studied at the Christian Theological Academy in Warsaw.

He became the Polish Army's chief Orthodox priest on  1 October 1998.  He received the gold Order of Merit for the Defence of the Country on 5 February 1999. He was conferred the rank of General Brigadier of the Polish Army by president Aleksander Kwaśniewski and was posthumously promoted to the rank of Major General by Bronisław Komorowski.

He died in the 2010 Polish Air Force Tu-154 crash on 10 April 2010, with the Polish President and other Polish dignitaries.  They were travelling to take part in the commemorations for the 70th anniversary of the Katyn massacre. Chodakowski was posthumously appointed a Commander of the Order of Polonia Restituta.

In 2017 it was revealed that when the Polish state reopened the investigation into the crash and exhumed victim's bodies, testing revealed that Chodakowski's coffin contained his body from the waist up and the body of general Tadeusz Ploski from the waist down.

References

1957 births
2010 deaths
People from Białystok
Members of the Polish Orthodox Church
Polish military chaplains
Victims of the Smolensk air disaster
Commanders of the Order of Polonia Restituta
Eastern Orthodox Christians from Poland